The Andorra national under-21 football team is the national under-21 football team of Andorra and is controlled by the Andorran Football Federation.

The team played the first match against Iceland, in an extra preliminary round for the 2007 European Under-21 Football Championship. They drew the first game 0–0 at home and lost the away leg 2–0. Andorra under-21 did not take part in the 2009 Under-21 European Championship qualifying, but was back again for the 2011 Under-21 Championship qualifying in 2009.
They won their first competitive match on 16 June 2015, beating Lithuania 1–0 at home.

UEFA U-21 Championship record

Current squad

The following players were called for the match against Czech Republic on 13 June 2022.
Caps and goals correct as of 13 June 2022, after the match against Czech Republic.

Recent call-ups
The following players have been called up for the team within the last 12 months and are still eligible to represent.

Notes
Players in italics have been capped for the senior team.

See also
 Andorra national football team
 Andorra national under-17 football team
 Andorra national under-19 football team

References

External links
 Andorra Under-21 at uefa.com

Andorra national football team
European national under-21 association football teams